The 2019 Bhutan Premier League was the eighth season of unified league, rebranded as the Bhutan Premier League (previously the Bhutan National League), the top national football competition in Bhutan, having replaced the A-Division in 2013.

The Bhutan Football Federation implemented a new league structure for this season. The top division is named Bhutan Premier League (BPL) and has featured ten teams across the country. The second division is named Bhutan Super League (BSL) and has featured nine teams across the country, replacing Thimphu League as qualifying competition for the Premier League. The lowest division is named Dzongkhag League where teams play in their respective districts (Dzongkhags) to gain promotion to the Super League.

Super League
The Bhutan Super League was played from April to June, in single round-robin format, featuring nine teams: five teams from Thimphu, one team from Paro, one team from Phuentsholing and two teams from the Bhutan Football Federation Academy.

Regular season

Playoffs

First semi-final

Second semi-final

Third semi-final

Final

Premier League
The Bhutan Premier League began in June and ended in November, in double round-robin format, featuring top five teams of the 2018 Bhutan National League and top five teams of the 2019 Bhutan Super League. Since Thimphu were dissolved, they were replaced by Phuentsholing United.

Teams

From 2018 Bhutan National League
Transport United
Paro
Thimphu City
Ugyen Academy
Phuentsholing United (replaced Thimphu which were dissolved)

From 2019 Bhutan Super League
High Quality United
Druk Stars
BFF Academy U-19
Druk United
Paro United

Personnel and kits

League table

References

External links
Facebook page of Bhutan Football Federation
Facebook page of Bhutan Premier League
RSSSF

Bhutan National League seasons
Bhutan
1